
Coburn may refer to:

Places
 Coburn, Pennsylvania, a census-designated place, United States
 Coburn, West Virginia, an unincorporated community, United States
 Coburn Mountain (Maine), United States
 Coburn Hill, Yellowstone County, Montana, United States
 Coburn, Western Australia, a  heavy mineral sand deposit, Australia

Other uses
 Coburn (surname)
 Coburn (band), an electronic music band from the United Kingdom
 Coburn Classical Institute, a former college preparatory school in Waterville, Maine
 O.W. Coburn School of Law

See also
 Cockburn (disambiguation), with the same pronunciation